Čelo means "forehead" in the Slavic languages. It may refer to:

 Toško Čelo, a settlement in Slovenia
 Gornje Čelo and Donje Čelo, Koločep, Croatia
 Čelo Grave, a grave in Podbeže, Slovenia

See also
 Celo (disambiguation)
 Čelo (disambiguation)
 Çelo (born 1977), Albanian singer and model
 Celos (disambiguation)
 Cello (disambiguation)
 Chelo (disambiguation)
 Cielo (disambiguation)
 Tamburica

Slavic words and phrases